Orvakal is a village and a Mandal Head quarter of Orvakal Mandal in Kurnool district in the state of Andhra Pradesh in India. It also part of Kurnool Urban Development Authority.

Geography 
The village is home to the Orvakal Rock Garden, which are silica and quartz rock formations amongst pools of water.

The Kethavaram Rock paintings, from the Paleolithic era, are located along a stretch of the Orvakal Rock Formations.

Transport 
A four lane road of NH40 [Old NH 18] passes through this village. It is well connected to Kurnool, 
Nandyal, Hyderabad, 
Banglore, Tirupati and 
Chennai through road. Kurnool Railway station is the nearest railway station.  Airport at Orvakal is to serve air transport needs of people of Kurnool City. This Airport Opened on March 25, 2021.Currently Flights are running from Orvakal airport to Banglore, Chennai and Visakhapatnam(Vizag).

Governance

Legislative 
Orvakal is Grama Panchayat, headed by Sarpanch.

Politics 

Orvakal is a part of Panyam (Assembly constituency) for Andhra Pradesh Legislative Assembly. KATASANI RAMBHUPAL REDDY is the present MLA of the constituency from YSR Congress Party. It is also a part of Nandyal (Lok Sabha constituency) which was won by POCHA BRAMHANANDA REDDY of YSR Congress Party.

Executive 
Orvakal comes under Kurnool Revenue Division. Orvakal Mandal is headed by Mandal Revenue Officer [M.R.O.] also called Tehsildar.

Judicial 
Orvakal Comes under Kurnool civil court.

Health 
Orvakal Town has Community Health Center [CHC], which covers both Orvakal Mandal and Kallur Mandal.

Electricity Department 
Orvakal mandal has separate Section office in Orvakal Town, which monitors Complete Orvakal Mandal.

Transport 
Orvakal mandal is connected with the help of  Kurnool depot buses.

Education 
The primary and secondary school education is imparted by government, aided and private schools, under the School Education Department of the state.[11][12] The medium of instruction followed by different schools are English, Telugu.

References 

Villages in Kurnool district